Aleksey Tregubov (born 1971) is a Belarusian cross-country skier. He competed for Belarus at the 1998 Winter Olympics in Nagano, and at the 2002 Winter Olympics in Salt Lake City.

References

1971 births
Living people
Belarusian male cross-country skiers
Cross-country skiers at the 1998 Winter Olympics
Cross-country skiers at the 2002 Winter Olympics
Olympic cross-country skiers of Belarus